Oldenburg Academy of the Immaculate Conception is a private, Catholic high school in Oldenburg, Indiana. The School was founded in 1851 by the Sisters of St. Francis in Oldenburg.  Mother Teresa Hackelmeier began the school, and during a harsh winter boarding began at Oldenburg Academy.  In 1986, the enrollment was up to 117.  Oldenburg Academy received its commission as a high school in 1910.  In the 1940s, great changes occurred:  the school moved to being a high school only and moved away from the elementary level. Later, the Sisters relinquished control of the academy and in 1994, Oldenburg Academy incorporated and began control by a board of trustees.  The boarding program ended at the end of the 1998–1999 school year.  And young men were admitted beginning in the fall of 2000. In 2020 the academy took a large step into the future by constructing a new athletic facility named the Hillenbrand Family Feldhaus.  The Alma Mater inspires students to "virtue, honor, and education." The current enrollment is 228 people.

References

</ref>

External links
 School website

Roman Catholic Archdiocese of Indianapolis
Catholic secondary schools in Indiana
Private high schools in Indiana
Schools in Franklin County, Indiana
Educational institutions established in 1852
1852 establishments in Indiana